Cybalomia ledereri is a moth in the family Crambidae. It is found in Niger.

References

Cybalomiinae
Moths described in 1921